Renate Anna Blank (née Reichenberger; 8 August 1941 – 16 June 2021) was a German politician and member of the Christian Social Union of Bavaria. She was born in Nuremberg and was a member of the Bundestag from 1990 to 2009.

References

External links 
 

1941 births
2021 deaths
Female members of the Bundestag
Members of the Bundestag for Bavaria
Officers Crosses of the Order of Merit of the Federal Republic of Germany
21st-century German women politicians
Members of the Bundestag 2005–2009
Members of the Bundestag 2002–2005
Members of the Bundestag 1998–2002
Members of the Bundestag 1994–1998
Members of the Bundestag for the Christian Social Union in Bavaria
20th-century German women
Politicians from Nuremberg